Krvavica may refer to: 

 , a rocky hill in Slovenia
 Krvavica, Croatia, a village in Baška Voda, Croatia
 Krvavica (Kruševac), a village in Kruševac, Serbia
 krvavica (крвавица), a type of blood sausage in Bosnia, Croatia and Serbia
 , a blood sausage in Slovenia, similar to the kaszanka